Edward Newman Brandt Jr. MD (July 3, 1933 – August 26, 2007) was an American physician, mathematician, and public health administrator. He was appointed acting Surgeon General of the United States from 1981 to 1982, and served as the United States Assistant Secretary for Health from 1981 to 1984.

Early life and career 
Born in Oklahoma City, Brandt graduated with an MD and PhD in biostatistics from the University of Oklahoma School of Medicine. He was a faculty member from his alma mater from 1961 to 1970 before moving to the University of Texas at Galveston (1970–1981), University of Maryland at Baltimore (1981–1989) and University of Oklahoma School of Medicine (1989–2007).

In 1984, Brandt agreed to attend an awards dinner to present an award to the Blood Sister Project a lesbian group that helped enlist and collect blood donations for AIDS victims. However, possibly due to pressure from "pro-family" groups, he did not attend.

Death 
Brandt died of lung cancer on August 26, 2007; he was 74 years old. His papers were donated to the National Library of Medicine.

References

 

1933 births
2007 deaths
Surgeons General of the United States
20th-century American mathematicians
People from Oklahoma City
University of Oklahoma alumni
Deaths from lung cancer in Oklahoma
University of Maryland School of Medicine faculty
Members of the National Academy of Medicine